Green Fields School is a free public charter school (a member campus of Accelerated Elementary and Secondary Schools) in Tucson, Arizona, United States. It provides educational services for elementary, middle, and high school students (Pre-K..12).

Previously Green Fields School was an independent, non-profit school. The school closed briefly filing bankruptcy in July 2019.

Green Fields, also known as Green Fields Country Day School, was founded in 1933 as the Circle Double A Green Fields Preparatory School for Boys, a boarding school. It became coed and ceased operating as a boarding school in the 1960s.

Notable alumni
 Blake Masters (2004), COO, Thiel Capital
 Mark Poirier (1986), writer
 Kerri Strug (1995), Olympic gymnast and member of the Magnificent Seven

References

Private high schools in Arizona
Private elementary schools in Arizona
Private middle schools in Arizona
Preparatory schools in Arizona